Howick is a village and former civil parish, now in the parish of Longhoughton, in Northumberland, England, between Boulmer and Craster. It is just inland from the North Sea, into which Howick Burn flows from Howick Hall. In 1951 the parish had a population of 246.

Governance 
On 1 April 1955 the parish was abolished and merged with Longhoughton.

Landmarks 

Howick Hall was the seat of the Prime Minister Charles Grey, 2nd Earl Grey, after whom the famous tea is named. The original Earl Grey tea was specially blended by a Chinese mandarin to suit the water at Howick, and was later marketed by Twinings.  Howick Hall Gardens & Arboretum are open to the public.

Howick is the namesake of the nearby Mesolithic Howick house archaeological site.

Notable people 
Charles Grey, 2nd Earl Grey, Prime Minister of the United Kingdom, after whom the tea is named, had his seat at Howick Hall.
Fred Taylor, Halley Professor of Physics at Oxford University, grew up in the village from age 5.

Notes

References

External links 

 Howick Hall Gardens site
 GENUKI (Accessed: 22 November 2008)

 
Villages in Northumberland
Populated coastal places in Northumberland
Former civil parishes in Northumberland
Longhoughton